Tunturi is a Finnish manufacturer of bicycles and fitness equipment.

History
Tunturi's history began in 1922. The foundations of the Tunturi brand began when brothers Aarne and Eero Harkke set up a small bike shop, Pyöräkellari Oy, in Turku, Finland. The name Tunturi comes from the Finnish word for a fell. Bike repairs were the shop's main focus at first, and then gradually they added some small-scale production, manufacturing Tunturi branded bicycles. The brand was very successful and within a few years the small shop was exchanged for a factory. By the 1950s the Tunturi brand was the domestic market leader in mopeds.

Utilising technology and expertise gained from bicycle production, Tunturi expanded into fitness equipment development. In the 1970s, Tunturi became recognized internationally as a producer of fitness equipment.

In the 1990s, a strategic decision was made to focus on the production of Tunturi fitness products and Tunturi bicycles. This decision was important for the further development of the brand. Tunturi is now a well-known brand in Scandinavian countries and Tunturi fitness products are sold in over 40 countries worldwide.

Tunturi is now located in Almere (near Amsterdam, The Netherlands) and owned by parent company Accell Group.

Moped models 

 Tunturi Tuisku
 Tunturi Maxi
 Tunturi Automat
 Tunturi Start
 Tunturi Classic
 Tunturi Sport
 Tunturi Super Sport
 Tunturi Trial
 Tunturi DX
 Tunturi Tiger
 Tunturi Tiger S
 Tunturi Tiger Air
 Tunturi Tiger Aqua
 Tunturi Hopper
 Tunturi Magnum X
 Tunturi City
 Tunturi "Lähetti"
 Tunturi Break

External links
 Official website

 
Vehicle manufacturing companies established in 1922
Cycle manufacturers of Finland
Finnish brands
Moped manufacturers
Motor vehicle manufacturers of Finland
1922 establishments in Finland
Exercise equipment companies